Fermín Díaz de Lecea López de Echazarreta (1905-1989), known as Fermín Lecea, was a Spanish-Argentine footballer, who played as defender in Club Atlético Independiente. He won the first championship of Independiente in the professional era.

Career 

Fermín Lecea was born in Spain, and settled in Argentina at a young age. He began his career in Newell's Old Boys. One of his most memorable matches in the Newell's team, was in the Victory 2-0 against Torino F.C., match played on August 15, 1929 in Rosario, Argentina.

Lecea debuted Independiente of Avellaneda in 1932, playing the final against River Plate this year. He won the championships of 1938 and 1939 and was captain of the same team.

Fermín Lecea finished his career playing for Club Atlético Tigre. Since 1948 to 1954 (except 1951) he served as coach of Rosario Central.

Titles

References

External links 
 Fermín Lecea at MemoriaWanderers.cl 
clubaindependiente.com
http://rosariofutbol.com/noticias/futbol/52902-hacemos-memoria-hoy-1930.htm

1905 births
1989 deaths
Sportspeople from Álava
Spanish footballers
Spanish expatriate footballers
Spanish emigrants to Argentina
Naturalized citizens of Argentina
Argentine footballers
Argentine expatriate footballers
Argentine people of Spanish descent
Newell's Old Boys footballers
Argentine Primera División players
Club Atlético Independiente footballers
Club Atlético Tigre footballers
Chilean Primera División players
Santiago Wanderers footballers
Unión Española footballers
Expatriate footballers in Chile
Spanish expatriate sportspeople in Chile
Argentine expatriate sportspeople in Chile
Association football defenders
Spanish football managers
Spanish expatriate football managers
Argentine football managers
Argentine expatriate football managers
Santiago Wanderers managers
Chilean Primera División managers
Expatriate football managers in Chile